Janik or  Janík is a Polish and Slovak patronymic surname derived from the given name Jan. Notable people with this surname include:
 Doug Janik (born 1980), American hockey player
 Krzysztof Janik (born 1950), Polish left-wing politician
 Mateusz Janik, Polish biathlete
 Ondrej Janík (born 1990), Slovak professional ice hockey player
 Zdzisław Janik, Polish footballer

References

Polish-language surnames
Slovak-language surnames
Patronymic surnames